Warner Valley is a census-designated place in Plumas County, California. The 2010 United States census reported Warner Valley's population was 2.

Geography
According to the United States Census Bureau, the CDP covers an area of 17.5 square miles (45.4 km), 99.83% of it land and 0.17% of it water.

Demographics
The 2010 United States Census reported that Warner Valley had a population of 2. The racial makeup of Warner Valley was 2 (100.0%) White. Hispanic or Latino of any race were 0 persons (0.0%).

References

Census-designated places in Plumas County, California
Census-designated places in California